Tarsoly Alexander (born 4 December 1987 in Ingolstadt, Germany) is a Hungarian ten-pin bowler who was the Bavarian youth master 2001  and back to back Hungarian youth master in 2002, currently playing in the German bowling second national league 17/18.

International competitions

National competitions

References

1987 births
Living people
Sportspeople from Ingolstadt